Mario Gino Merlino (born April 5, 1928) is a retired singer and musician, known for providing the singing voice of Lancelot in the musical film Camelot, and for being part of the Grammy Award winning quartet, The Anita Kerr Singers.

Early life 
Gene Merlino was born Mario Gino Merlino on April 5, 1928, in San Francisco, California, to Cesare and Teresa (née Incaviglia) Merlino. His first exposure to music came from his two older brothers; John was an accomplished accordionist, and Victor took up the clarinet but did not stick with it for long. Gene originally wanted to play trumpet, as he admired Harry James, but instead picked up the available clarinet in his early teens. A few years later he had learned the saxophone well enough to start playing for dances and weddings near his Potrero Hill neighborhood.

After graduating from Mission High School he enrolled in San Francisco State as a Music major, playing clarinet and achieving first chair concertmaster in the college's symphonic band by his sophomore year. He also spent one semester at Eastman School of Music.

Career

Radio 

In 1950, Merlino left college before graduating when he got his first steady musical job with the Bill Weaver show on KCBS radio, which at that time broadcast out of the Palace Hotel in San Francisco. Although he initially only played saxophone, he soon became the regular male vocalist, performing five nights a week. At this time he "realized that singing was going to be [his] main career in music". He stayed with KCBS for three years before moving to Los Angeles, California.

Jazz Bands 

After arriving in Los Angeles, Merlino joined the jazz bands of Frankie Carle, then Ray Anthony. Anthony then started his short-lived television variety show, The Ray Anthony Show, in 1956, allowing Merlino to be seen by a nationwide audience. When the Anthony show was canceled in May 1957 after only one season, Merlino joined the Freddy Martin band, who played regularly at the famous Cocoanut Grove club in the Ambassador Hotel in Los Angeles. Merlino remained with this band until 1963.

Television 

Beginning in 1963 and continuing through 1979, Merlino was a regular performer for many television variety shows, starting with The Red Skelton Show. He would eventually become a regular for The Pearl Bailey Show, The Judy Garland Show, the Carol Burnett Show, The Julie Andrews Hour, the Sonny & Cher Comedy Hour, Donny & Marie, and the Ken Berry Wow Show.

In later years, his vocals could be heard on The Simpsons. He performed the song "Born Free" on the episode "Whacking Day", "South of the Border" on "Kamp Krusty", and "Jellyfish" in "A Star Is Born Again".

Studio Recordings and Film 

In 1956 he provided the singing voice for the character of Tom Robinson Lee, played by John Kerr, in the movie Tea and Sympathy.

In 1965 he was part of the four-man singing group that recorded the theme song for Gilligan's Island. In 1966, Merlino joined the male singing quartet, The Mellomen, with Thurl Ravenscroft, Bill Lee and Bill Cole, after Max Smith retired. Merlino and the Mellomen appeared in the Elvis Presley movie, The Trouble With Girls. Thanks to this, Merlino began to get regular work as a session singer in the various recording studios in Hollywood and Los Angeles, eventually singing for thousands of movies, television programs, radio and television commercials, audio recordings, and song poems, during a career that lasted more than 50 years.

His most famous recordings were as part of the Anita Kerr Singers, who won a 1967 Grammy Award (Best Performance by a Vocal Group) for their performance of "A Man and a Woman" (along with a 1969 Edison Award), and for providing the singing voice for the character of Lancelot, played by Franco Nero, in the 1967 movie Camelot. In 1973 he was part of the chorus who went on a worldwide tour with Burt Bacharach to promote the movie Lost Horizon, for which Bacharach wrote the music.

Additionally, Merlino was part of the "L.A. Voices", who were nominated for a Grammy Award (Best Jazz Vocal Performance - Duo or Group) in 1983 for the Supersax album "Supersax & L.A. Voices". He also claims to have recorded more than 10,000 song poems, primarily under the pseudonyms Gene Marshall or John Muir, and was featured in the 2003 PBS documentary "Off the Charts".

Personal life 
Merlino married Lois Elizabeth Draper on November 18, 1953. Merlino met Draper in the symphonic band at San Francisco State, where she played flute. Almost immediately after marrying they moved to the North Hollywood region of Los Angeles, so Gene could foster his singing career, as there was much more studio recording work available in Hollywood and Los Angeles than in San Francisco. They had two children, Monica and John. They lived in various parts of Los Angeles until 1995, when they moved to Camarillo, California. Their marriage lasted for 55 years until Lois died on April 3, 2009, at the age of 78.

References

External links 

 Gene Merlino on IMDB
 "This Could Be The Night" from The Ray Anthony Show on youtube
 "C'est Moi" from Camelot on youtube
 "If Ever I Would Leave You" from Camelot on youtube
 Song Poem "I am a Ginseng Digger" on youtube

1928 births
Living people
Musicians from California
San Francisco State University alumni
Eastman School of Music alumni